The Independent Voters Association, or IVA, was a North Dakota, United States, political organization.

It formed on May 1, 1918, at the height of the Nonpartisan League's influence on the North Dakota Republican Party.  The IVA was a conservative, capitalist faction created to counter the NPL's socialist leanings.  Its leading founder was E. W. Everson who had served from 1913 to 1918 in the North Dakota State House of Representatives. As the NPL went into decline during the 1940s, most of the goals of the IVA had been met, and it eventually disbanded. Its most notable success was the 1921 North Dakota gubernatorial recall election of Ragnvald A. Nestos to replace Lynn Frazier as Governor of North Dakota.

See also
Politics of North Dakota
Political party strength in North Dakota

References

Political parties established in 1918
Political parties disestablished in the 1940s
History of North Dakota
Politics of North Dakota
Political parties in North Dakota
1918 establishments in North Dakota
1940s disestablishments in North Dakota